Coburg is a town in Germany.

Coburg may also refer to:

Places
Antarctica
 Coburg Peak, Graham Land

Australia
 Coburg, Victoria, a suburb of Melbourne
 City of Coburg, a former local government area
 Cobourg Peninsula, Northern Territory

Canada
 Cobourg, Ontario
 Coburg Island, Nunavut

Germany
 Free State of Coburg, which existed from 1918 to 1920
 Coburg (district), a district of Bavaria
Coburg (electoral district), a parliamentary constituency of Bavaria

United States
 Coburg, Indiana, an unincorporated community
 Coburg, Iowa, a city
 Coburg, Kentucky, an unincorporated community
 Coburg, Oregon, a city
 Coburg Hills, a range of foothills of the Cascades, east of Coburg, Oregon

Sports
 FC Coburg, a football club in Bavaria
 DVV Coburg, a former football club in Bavaria, predecessor of FC Coburg
 HSC 2000 Coburg, a handball team in Bavaria
 Coburg Football Club, Coburg, Australia

Schools
 Coburg University of Applied Sciences, Coburg, Bavaria
 Coburg High School, Coburg, Australia

Other uses
 Coburg Dock, Port of Liverpool, England
 , a Kriegsmarine weather ship
 Operation Coburg, a 1968 Australian and New Zealand Vietnam War operation

See also
Cobourg, a town in Ontario, Canada